In My Life is the title of Cilla Black's eighth solo studio album released in 1974 by EMI. The album was her first to be produced by Australian producer David Mackay who had notched up chart hits for Cliff Richard and The New Seekers.

Mackay's remit for the project was to develop a new sound for Black which would keep her music in tune with the current pop market. He wanted to move away from her trademark power-ballad orchestrations and produce a soft rock record in the vein of "Step Inside Love" which he considered to be her finest work.

The lead single "Baby We Can't Go Wrong" reached #36 on the UK Singles Chart. It was also used as the opening theme tune to season 7 of Black's BBC TV variety show Cilla.

Re-Release
On 7 September 2009, EMI Records released a special edition of the album exclusively to digital download. This re-issue featured all of the album's original recordings re-mastered by Abbey Road Studios from original 1/4" stereo master tapes. A digital booklet containing original album artwork, detailed track information and rare photographs was made available from iTunes with purchases of the entire album re-issue.

Track listing
Side one
 "Flashback" (O'Day, Wayne) - 3:19
 "I'll Have to Say I Love You, in a Song" (Jim Croce) - 2:36
 "Everything I Own" (David Gates) - 3:05
 "Baby We Can't Go Wrong" (Dunning) - 2:53
 "Someone" (Cole, Wolfe) - 2:48 
 "Daydreamer" (Dempsey) - 2:12

Side two
 "In My Life" (John Lennon, Paul McCartney) - 2:30
 "Never Run Out (Of You)" (Ashby, Colwell, Colwell) - 2:25
 "Let Him In" (Benson) - 2:21
 "The Air That I Breathe" (Hammond, Hazlewood) - 3:45
 "Like a Song" (Park) - 2:23 
 "I Believed It All" (Un Sorriso E Poi Perdonami) (Black, Bigazzi, Bela) - 2:52

Personnel
 Cilla Black - lead vocals
 Produced and arranged by David Mackay
 Engineered by Roger Quested and Tony Clark
 Trevor Spencer, Barrie Guard - drums
 Ray Cooper, Barrie Guard - percussion
 Alan Tarney - bass
 Pianography - Cliff Hall, Dave MacRae
 Terry Britten, Kevin Peek - guitar
 Gordon Huntley - steel guitar
 David Mackay - Moog synthesizer
 Terry Britten, Alan Tarney, David Mackay, The Breakaways, Anna Peacock - backing vocals
 Orchestration led by Pat Halling
 John Kelly - cover photography

References

External links
CillaBlack.com Discography – In My Life
EMI Music Official Site

Further reading
 

1974 albums
Cilla Black albums
Albums produced by David Mackay (producer)
EMI Records albums
Albums recorded at Morgan Sound Studios